The Fox Hotel, at Broadway and NE 1st St. in Laverne, Oklahoma, is a historic hotel built in 1912.  It was listed on the National Register of Historic Places in 1978.

Located at an entrance to the Oklahoma panhandle, it was built in 1912 when the railroad arrived.

References

Hotels in Oklahoma
National Register of Historic Places in Harper County, Oklahoma
Hotel buildings completed in 1912
1912 establishments in Oklahoma